Ypsilanti is an unincorporated community in Talbot County, in the U.S. state of Georgia.

History
The community's name is a transfer from Ypsilanti, Michigan. Variant names are "Red Bone" and "Ypsillanti". A post office called Ypsilanti was established in 1883, and remained in operation until 1916.

References

Unincorporated communities in Georgia (U.S. state)
Unincorporated communities in Talbot County, Georgia